Salah Falah was a Lebanese football player, coach, and referee. Falah played as a midfielder for the Lebanon national team in their first official international match.

Playing career 
Falah played for Hilmi-Sport, DPHB, and Sagesse during the 1940s.

In 1934 the midfielder captained the Lebanon national team in their first unofficial match, against Romanian club CA Timișoara (T.A.C.). Falah also represented Lebanon in their first official international match, in 1940 against Mandatory Palestine.

Managerial and referee career 
In 1946–47 Falah coached Sagesse while a player. He was a referee during the 1960–61 season.

See also
 List of Lebanon international footballers born outside Lebanon

References

External links
 

Year of birth missing
Year of death missing
Association football midfielders
Lebanese footballers
Lebanese Premier League players
AS Hilmi-Sport players
AS DPHB players
Sagesse SC footballers
Lebanon international footballers
Lebanese football managers
Lebanese Premier League managers
Sagesse SC football managers
Lebanese football referees